The Nano-Tera.ch research program is a Swiss federal program, funding scientific projects which endorse nanotechnology on a tera and Nano Tera scale.  The goal is to improve technology for health, security, energy and the environment.

Some of its goals are to detect real time different health risks and conditions through body-integrated bio probing, to reveal security risks through smart buildings and environments, to save energy through ambient sensing and to detect environmental hazards such as floods and avalanches from inaccessible positions on earth.

Project Structures

There are three types of projects: 
 Research, Technology and Development (RTD) are large budget, multidisciplinary projects with highly ambitious objectives, and have a four-year lifespan
 Nano-Tera Focused (NTF) are small projects with a very focused objective
 Educational and Dissemination (ED) projects allow undergraduates, postgraduates and even members of the public to take part

External links
Nano-Tera.ch

Science and technology in Switzerland